Johannes of Jerusalem (1042–1119), born Jehan de Vezelay, a French Catholic religious leader, was the abbot of the monastery at Vézelay, France, as well as one of the founders of Knights Templar. He became a prophet after claiming he discovered a secret at the temple mountain of Jerusalem post-crusade.

See also
Catholic Church in France

References

External links
http://www.roypanther.de/Propheten/J_v_Jerusalem/j_v_jerusalem.html
http://www.j-lorber.de/proph/seher/johannes-von-jerusalem.htm
http://www.weltnetz-verweise.de/informatives/11-09-05-jvj.html (archive)

Prophets
1042 births
1119 deaths